Eccles, Norfolk may refer to:

Eccles on Sea, North Norfolk
Eccles St Mary, Breckland